The Silahtarağa Power Station was a coal-fired generating station located in Istanbul Turkey. The Ottoman Empire's first power plant, it was in use from 1914 to 1983. The site has since been converted into a university campus for the Istanbul Bilgi University and houses two museums and several facilities. It was refurbished and renamed SantralIstanbul in 2007.

History

The power plant was designed as the first in the Ottoman Empire apart from a small hydroelectric power station built in 1902 outside Tarsus in Anatolia. The Budapest based Austria-Hungarian Gas and Electric Company, Ganz, was contracted to build the power station.  In 1910 the firm had established the Ottoman Electric Company in cooperation with two Belgian banks: the Banque de Bruxelles and the Banque Generale de Credit Hangrois. The company obtained an imperial concession lasting 50 years, and built its first station a coal-fired plant in the Silahtarağa neighbourhood, Eyüp at the upper end of Golden Horn.

The power plant started service on the February 11, 1914 it supplied power initially to the tram network and shortly after to the sultan's palace. Before long electrical power was prevalent in the city's more prosperous districts as well.

The foreign-owned company was nationalized in 1937 and turned over on July 1, 1938 to the Municipality of Istanbul. From then on it was managed by the 'Electricity, Tunnel and Tram Company of Istanbul' (IETT). Silahtarağa power station was the sole electricity producer in Istanbul until the 1950s. In 1952, the station was linked to the newly created Turkish national grid. From 1962 it was operated by Etibank and in 1970 control was passed to the Turkish Electric Institution (TEK).

The Silahtarağa power station initially had three 6 MW generators. This capacity was later increased to 80 MW.

On the March 13, 1983, Silahtarağa power station was shut down because it was no longer economic to operate. The plant was left largely derelict for the next 20 years .

In 1991, the plant was listed as a 'cultural and natural object of Istanbul' giving it special protection.

Redevelopment project
In 2002, a redevelopment plan was drawn up  by Oğuz Özerden, a young businessman and the founder of Istanbul Bilgi University. The project aimed to convert the former plant into a university campus. Under this plan the former station buildings would be used to house two new museums. One a gallery dedicated to modern art, the other an energy museum.

It was this blueprint which received official backing. An alternative project was submitted by  the Istanbul branch of the Chamber of Electrical Engineers in cooperation with the Istanbul Technical University, Bilgi University's project was approved by the Ministry of Energy and Natural Resources, and was realized in three years with the financial support of some leading Turkish companies.

The complex was renamed SantralIstanbul after the Turkish word "Santral" meaning power station. The complex was officially  opened on September 8, 2007. Alongside the art gallery and energy museum, the university has created: a public library, amphitheatre several smaller facilities for art, cultural events and educational institutions.

The Energy Museum at Santralİstanbul
The remaining generating equipment is preserved as part of the display at Santralİstanbul energy museum. It was integrated into the design by architect Han Tümertekin. Situated in the turbine hall with three generator groups, the museum is a collection of the steam turbines, the electrical generators and the equipment of the former Silahtarağa power plant, on display in almost original conditions.

Tours are self-guided. Here, modern glass escalators replaced the former coal conveyors between the floors. In order to have a good overview of the machinery in the huge hall, a podium is hanged at 12 m height, which leads the visitors to the control room. After the control room, the tour route returns to the entrance by way of the turbine hall floor.

The podium has a rough wooden floor and glass sides framed in steel. The control room is preserved nearly in its original form, and was only cleaned.

The lower level of the technical museum has also moving exhibits, where the visitors are encouraged to push buttons and work levers for interactive learning.

Original relay and control instrumentation and wiring is visible.  There are many examples from dozens of former and existing manufacturers.  Most impressive is the large scale of equipment which was once necessary to generate only a few dozen Megawatts.

Admission and transport
The museum is open to public from 10.00 to 22.00 hours everyday except Mondays. Admission is free of charge.

Parking and pedestrian access is from the south, immediately after the Kağıthane bridge.  Pedestrian access is also possible from the north, adjacent to Fil Köprusü (Alibey elephant bridge), which permits foot and bike access from Eyüp and the west side of the Haliç.

A shuttle bus service free of charge is provided for the visitors  departing from Atatürk Cultural Center in Taksim every half an hour.  İETT does operate several bus lines in the immediate vicinity.

Address:
Eski Silahtarağa Elektrik Santrali (Former Silahtarağa Power Station)
Silahtar Mah. Kazım Karabekir Cad. 1
Eyüp, Istanbul

Images

References

External links

SantralIstanbul official website 

Buildings and structures in Istanbul
Coal-fired power stations in Turkey
Energy infrastructure completed in 1914
1914 establishments in the Ottoman Empire
Redevelopment projects in Istanbul
Technology museums in Turkey
Museums in Istanbul
Golden Horn
Istanbul Bilgi University